Halffter is a surname. Notable people with the surname include:

Rodolfo Halffter (1900–1987), Spanish composer, brother of Ernesto
Ernesto Halffter (1905–1989), Spanish composer
Cristóbal Halffter (1930–2021), Spanish composer, father of Pedro
Pedro Halffter Caro (born 1971), Spanish conductor and composer